Buffers Alley is a Gaelic Athletic Association club based in the villages of Kilmuckridge and Monamolin in County Wexford, Ireland. The club fields teams in Intermediate hurling, Gaelic football and camogie. It competes in Wexford competitions.

History
The Buffers Alley club is one of the oldest in Wexford, founded in the late 1870s. It came quickly to the fore and won its first title in 1905. Twenty-three lean years followed for the club but the spirit of the men of 1905 eventually bore fruit when they won another junior title in 1928. History repeated itself 23 years later – 1951 when the third junior title came. In 1952 they played St Aidan's again in the senior championship but were narrowly defeated. Having played senior for three years they reverted to the junior grade in 1955.

In 1959 the Shamrocks defeated them in a memorable junior semi-final. With many young players coming from the Rackard League competitions, the club entered Intermediate competition in 1962 Even though it was only a junior club, this was the move that set Buffers Alley on the road to the top. They were beaten in their first Intermediate year by Hollow Rangers and Davidstown-Courtnacuddy the following year.

The first Intermediate win came in 1965 and the same year won under 21 honours for the first time and repeated that again in 1966. These wins sowed the seeds for many years to come. Entering senior grade in 1967, they quickly came to the top, been beaten by their greatest rivals – that famous Rathnure combination. 1968 was to be their year. Their success story really started on a terrible day in Belfield, with rain, wind, sleet and snow and few loyal supporters, they slowly, but surely, overcame a hard fighting St Martin's side. Battling their way to the final, they went in as underdogs and made history on that memorable day in December against a very talented Harriers side.  This team was captained by Joe Murphy in the absence of Captain, Paddy Sinnott. They repeated this in 1970. Beaten in the 1973 final by Rathnure. Buffers Alley returned to their winning ways in 1975 and 1976 beating Oulart-The Ballagh and Rapparees respectively. Defeats in the final of '80 and '81 were followed by what can only be described as the Golden Era for Buffers Alley winning eight Wexford Senior Hurling Championship titles over the next ten years.

During the 1970s and 80s Buffers Alley made an impact on the football scene in Co. Wexford. They created a surprise in 1972 in winning the county junior football title. Proving this to be no flash in the pan, they won the Intermediate football final in 1974 and completed in senior ranks for a number of years. They returned to Intermediate ranks in the mid 80's and once again were successful in the Intermediate football championship in 1989.

Their first ever appearance in a Leinster Senior Club Hurling Championship final was in 1971 when they were narrowly defeated by St Rynagh's of Offaly. A Buffers Alley team captained by Sean Whelan beat a Kinnity back boned by the great Pat Delaney and the Corrigan brothers Mark and Paddy in the 1985 final and went all the way to the All-Ireland Final but was defeated by Kilruane MacDonagh's in a close final. They beat Ballyhale Shamrocks from Kilkenny in the 1988 Leinster Final with great displays by Mick Butler and a fantastic display by the emerging Colin Whelan at left half back and a tireless display by his brother Sean at mid field back boning the victory. The crowning glory for Buffers Alley arrived on St Patrick's Day in 1989 when they became the first and only County Wexford club to win the All-Ireland Senior Club Hurling Championship with a well-deserved win over O'Donovan Rossa with goals by Seamus O'Leary and Paddy Donahue breaking the Rossa. This team was captained by Pat Kenny the whole hearted full back and one of the greatest men ever to wear the green and gold and remains a legend within the club. They last competed at this level in 1992 when they once again took Leinster Club honours but lost out to Sarsfields of Galway in the Semi-Final.There next county final was in 2007 losing to Oulart and then in 2009 they faced the same opposition but lost again.

Camogie
Buffers Alley camogie club is the joint second most successful in the history of the All-Ireland Senior Club Camogie Championship with a total of five victories in 1979, 1981, 1982, 1983 and 1984. They won a further Leinster championship title in 1980. During this ascendance they won 14 successive Wexford county titles.
Founded in 1969 by Tom O'Leary, Tom Butler, John Doyle, Syl Murphy, Bertie Cousins and Peter Kavanagh, they won the Wexford Junior Championship in their first year and the senior title in 1971.

Honors
 All-Ireland Senior Club Hurling Championship (1)
 1989
 All-Ireland Senior Club Camogie Championship (5)
 1979, 1981, 1982, 1983, 1984; runners-up 1978, 1980
 Leinster Senior Club Hurling Championship (3)
 1986, 1988, 1992; runners-up 1983
 Wexford Senior Hurling Championship (12)
 1968, 1970, 1975, 1976, 1982, 1983, 1984, 1985, 1988, 1989, 1991, 1992
 Wexford Intermediate Hurling Championship (2)
 1965, 2013
 Wexford Intermediate Football Championship (2)
 1974, 1989
 Wexford Junior Hurling Championship (4)
 1905, 1928, 1951, 1982
 Wexford Junior Football Championship (1)
 1972, 2022
 Wexford Under-21 Hurling Championship (4)
 1965 (with Oulart–The Ballagh), 1966 (with Oulart–The Ballagh), 1984 (with St. Patrick's), 1986 (with St. Patrick's)
 Wexford Minor Football Championship (1)
 1983 (with St. Patrick's)
 Wexford Minor Hurling Championships: (1)
 1967 (with Oulart–The Ballagh)

Notable players
 Mick Butler
 Tom Dempsey
 Colm Doran
 Tony Doran
 Willie Doran
 Ciarán Kenny
Robbie Kirwan

Camogie
 All-Ireland Senior Club Camogie Championship Winners 1980, 1982, 1983, 1984, 1985

Notable players
 Elsie Cody (née Walsh)
 Dorothy Kenny (née Walsh)
 Deirdre Breen (née Cousins)
 Martina Murphy (née Cousins)
 Kathleen Tonks
 Eilís Kavanagh
 Fiona Cousins
 Caroline Farrington (née O'Leary)
 Stellah Sinnott
 Margaret Leacy (née O'Leary)
 Bridie Doran
 Maggie Hearne
 Geraldine Duggan
 Terri Butler
 Nora Gahan

References

External links
 Buffers Alley club website

Gaelic games clubs in County Wexford
Hurling clubs in County Wexford
Gaelic football clubs in County Wexford